The 2000 Peach Bowl was the 33rd Peach Bowl game and featured the LSU Tigers, and the Georgia Tech Yellow Jackets.

LSU scored first on a 32-yard John Corbello field goal to take a 3–0 lead. Georgia Tech responded with a 32-yard Joe Burns touchdown run to take a 7–3 lead. In the second quarter, Jermaine Hatch scored on a 9-yard touchdown run, giving Tech a 14–3 lead.

In the third quarter, Rohan Davey threw a 3-yard touchdown pass to Tommy Banks, as LSU got within 14–9. In the fourth quarter, Davey threw a 9-yard touchdown pass to Josh Reed giving LSU a 17–14 lead. John Corbello kicked a 49-yard field goal giving the Tigers a 20–14 advantage. Davey later threw a 3-yard touchdown pass to Tommy Banks as LSU won by a 28-14 count.

References

Peach Bowl
Peach Bowl
LSU Tigers football bowl games
Georgia Tech Yellow Jackets football bowl games
December 2000 sports events in the United States
Peach
2000 in Atlanta